Kitakoiwa (北小岩) is a town in Edogawa, Tokyo.

Demographics 
The town has a population of 29,113 people.

Education 
Edogawa Board of Education operates public elementary and junior high schools.

The following elementary schools serve portions of Kitaoiwa: Kita-Koiwa (北小岩小学校), Nakakoiwa (中小岩小学校), Kamikoiwa (上小岩小学校), and Kamikoiwa No. 2 (上小岩第二小学校). All residents are zoned to Koiwa No. 3 Junior High School (江戸川区立小岩第三中学校).

There are four elementary schools.

Popular culture 
Kitakoiwa was discussed during the 2016 film Rudolf the Black Cat.

Notable people 

 Genki Fujii, political scientist

References 

Districts of Edogawa, Tokyo